Dmitri Gurkov (born 3 June 1996) is a Kazakhstani ice hockey player for Barys Astana in the Kontinental Hockey League (KHL) and the Kazakhstani national team.

He represented Kazakhstan at the 2021 IIHF World Championship.

References

External links

1996 births
Living people
Barys Nur-Sultan players
Ice hockey people from Moscow
Kazakhstani ice hockey centres